Bibakhtino (Beybaqtı) is a rural locality (a village) in Turbaslinsky Selsoviet, Iglinsky District, Bashkortostan, Russia. The population was 185 as of 2010. There is 1 street.

Geography 
Bibakhtino is located 21 km south of Iglino (the district's administrative centre) by road. Barantsevo is the nearest rural locality.

References 

Rural localities in Iglinsky District